Promise of Love is an album by The American Analog Set.  It was released on June 17, 2003, on Tiger Style Records.

Track listing

References

2003 albums
The American Analog Set albums